Ectopatria spilonata is a moth of the family Noctuidae. It is found in New South Wales and South Australia.

The larvae feed on Atriplex vesicaria.

External links
Australian Faunal Directory

Moths of Australia
Noctuinae
Moths described in 1902